Bars Media Documentary Film Studio was established in 1993 by Vardan Hovhannisyan, who began his career as a frontline filmmaker covering hotspots in the former Soviet Union.

Bars Media's documentaries have been broadcast on BBC Storyville, ARTE, WDR, ITVS, YLE and on many other international channels.  Located in Armenia, the studio is uniquely positioned at the crossroads of Europe and Asia, and is thus able to cover a wide range of stories from the region. It is a dynamic studio, with 12 people who are responsible for all stages of documentary filmmaking, starting from early research all the way through post-production.

Bars Media has had recent global success with the documentary A Story of People in War and Peace. This multi-award-winning film is a co-production between Bars Media, the BBC, ARTE, WDR, and YLE. The film follows director Vardan Hovhannisyan as he seeks out the soldiers with whom he had served on the front lines of the Kharabagh war in the early 1990s, in order to find out what had become of them 12 years later.  The film raises ultimate questions about the human costs of war and how it changes one's life forever.

Recently the studio produced the documentary The Last Tightrope Dancer in Armenia, an international co-production with NHK, ITVS, YLE, SVT, TVP and TV Estonia. The film tells the story of two of Armenia's most celebrated tightrope dancers, both in their late seventies, who must search for an apprentice to take over this ancient art form, or face having it lost forever.	

The studio is now working on the development of a number of documentary series. One is called Hot Archeology, and the first film is about aerial archeology in Afghanistan. This film is a chance to show another side of Afghanistan, which recently has been an object of interest only due to war and violence.  Viewers will learn about the interesting story of that territory, told from above.  As the viewers watch, they will feel as if they are right there along with the expedition, discovering the history and culture of Afghanistan.

The second is a series of humorous documentaries, or "donkeymentaries". Each donkeymentary will show a different country where there are fascinating stories of donkeys. The first film of the series is about Lamu Island in Kenya, a place with 24,000 people, 6,000 donkeys, 2 cars, and a donkey racing champion who has no donkey of his own.

External links
Bars Media Documentary Film Studio Official website
"A Story of People in War and Peace" Official website
"The Last Tightrope Dancer in Armenia" Official website

Documentary film production companies
Cinema of Armenia
Companies of Armenia
Yerevan
Armenian companies established in 1993
Mass media companies established in 1993